Emilio "Emili" Sagi Liñán (born Bolívar, Buenos Aires, Argentina, 15 March 1900; died Barcelona, 25 May 1951), was a Spanish footballer who played as a left-winger for FC Barcelona, the Catalan XI and Spain during the 1920s and 1930s. He was the son of Emilio Sagi Barba, the  Catalan baritone singer, and Concepción Liñán Pelegrí, a dancer, and as a result, was widely referred to as Sagi-Barba (father's surnames together in a single surname).

During his playing career he played 455 games and scored 134 goals for FC Barcelona and is best remembered for forming a successful partnership with Paulino Alcántara. Together with Josep Samitier, Ricardo Zamora, Félix Sesúmaga and, later, Franz Platko they were prominent members of the successful FC Barcelona team coached by Jack Greenwell.

His younger brother, Luís Sagi Vela, followed in his father's footsteps and also became a successful baritone singer. His son, Victor Sagi, later ran one of the biggest advertising agencies in Spain and in 1978 announced his candidacy for the presidency of FC Barcelona, but withdrew before the election was held.

Early life
Sagi-Barba was born in Argentina, where his father regularly toured and performed, but returned to Catalonia when he was three. He was educated at the Colegio Condal and Colegio Bonanova and his childhood friends included Salvador Dalí and Josep Samitier. During holidays at the Catalan resort of Cadaqués, the trio played football together. He also played football at school and as a junior with FC Catalònia, before joining FC Barcelona in 1915.

FC Barcelona

In 1917, as a 17-year-old, Sagi-Barba made his senior debut with FC Barcelona and during the 1918–19 season he helped the team win the Championat de Catalunya. In 1919 he left FC Barcelona to study in Terrassa. After getting married, he briefly retired from the game. However in 1922 he rejoined FC Barcelona and embarked on a successful career which saw him win ten Championats de Catalunya, four Copa del Rey and the inaugural La Liga.

International career
Between 1922 and 1936 he played at least 15 games and scored at least 5 goals for the Catalan XI. However, records from the era do not always include accurate statistics and he may have played and scored more. Together with Paulino Alcántara, Josep Samitier and Ricardo Zamora he helped the Catalan XI win an inter-regional competition, the Prince of Asturias Cup, twice during the 1920s. In the 1924 final, he scored a late equalizer in extra-time to salvage a 4–4 draw and force a replay, in which he helped the Catalan XI win 3–2. He also played once for Spain, in a 4–2 win over Hungary in 1926.

Honours

Club
FC Barcelona
Spanish League: 1929
Spanish Cup: 1922, 1925, 1926, 1928
Catalan Champions: 1918–19, 1921–22, 1923–24, 1924–25, 1925–26, 1926–27, 1927–28, 1929–30, 1930–31, 1931–32

International
Catalan XI
Copa Príncep d'Astúries: 1923-24, 1926

See also
List of Spain international footballers born outside Spain

References

External links
 
 National team data 
 FC Barcelona archives 
 FC Barcelona profile

1900 births
1951 deaths
Sportspeople from Buenos Aires Province
Argentine emigrants to Spain
Argentine people of Spanish descent
Argentine footballers
Spanish footballers
Association football forwards
La Liga players
FC Barcelona players
Spain B international footballers
Spain international footballers
Argentine people of Catalan descent
Footballers from Barcelona
Catalonia international footballers